The Australasian flying fish, Cheilopogon pinnatibarbatus melanocercus, is a subspecies of flyingfish of the family Exocoetidae, found off New South Wales of Australia, and around New Zealand, in surface waters. The Australasian flying fish feeds mainly on plankton and small crustaceans.

References
 
 Tony Ayling & Geoffrey Cox, Collins Guide to the Sea Fishes of New Zealand,  (William Collins Publishers Ltd, Auckland, New Zealand 1982)

Notes

Australasian flying fish